Gurcharan may refer to:

Lt. Colonel Gurcharan Singh Grewal, Indian field hockey player
Gurcharan Singh Tohra, Sikh politician 
Gurcharan Das, Indian author, commentator and public intellectual
Gurcharan Singh (boxer), Indian amateur boxer
Gurcharan Rampuri, Canadian poet

Indian masculine given names